The  is an award for biological sciences in Japan. It is awarded annually by the Kihara Memorial Yokohama Foundation for the Achievement of Life Sciences, to commemorate Hitoshi Kihara, Japan's pioneer geneticist.

Award information

The Kihara Memorial Foundation Award is presented to young researchers who have conducted outstanding original research in life sciences. At the annual award presentation held at the Kihara Institute for Biological Research, winners receive 2 million yen, a diploma, and a silver statuette of Benthamidia japonica (Japanese flowering dogwood).

Award winners
Notable award winners are:
 1993: Taisei Nomura, Osaka University
 1994: Makoto Asashima, University of Tokyo
 1995: Takashi Gojobori, National Institute of Genetics
 1999: Takao Kondo, Nagoya University
 2001: Kunihiro Matsumoto, Nagoya University
 2002: Shigeo Ohno, Yokohama City University
 2006: Nobuki Matsuoka, Nagoya University
 2009: Takashi Araki, Kyoto University 
 2011: Ken Shirasu, RIKEN
2014: Yukiko Goto, University of Tokyo

See also

 List of biology awards

References

External links
 

Awards established in 1993
Biology awards
Early career awards
Foundations based in Japan
Japanese science and technology awards